The black shrew (Suncus ater) is a white-toothed shrew only known from Mount Kinabalu in the Malaysian state of Sabah on the island of Borneo.

It is known from a single specimen (holotype) which was collected in montane forest at 1,600 meters elevation.

Suncus
Endemic fauna of Borneo
Mammals of Malaysia
Endemic fauna of Malaysia
Mammals of Borneo
Mammals described in 1965
Fauna of Mount Kinabalu
Fauna of the Borneo montane rain forests